FK Khiva is Uzbekistani football club based in Khiva. It currently plays in the Uzbekistan First League.

History

FK Khiva plays in the West Conference of the Uzbekistan First League. In 2012 season, the club reached the championship round, finishing 4th in its zone. At the end of the season in the championship round, they finished 10th.

Stadium
The club's home ground is "Spartak Stadium" in Khiva with a capacity of 8,000 spectators.

Managerial history

References

External links
 FK Khiva matches and results
 FK Khiva matches and results

Football clubs in Uzbekistan